Janet Martin Soskice (born 16 May 1951) is a Canadian-born English Roman Catholic theologian and philosopher. Soskice was educated at Somerville College, Oxford. She is professor of philosophical theology and a fellow of Jesus College at the University of Cambridge. Her theological and philosophical work has dealt with the role of women in Christianity, religious language, and the relationship between science and religion.

Her book The Sisters of Sinai details the history of the discovery of the Syriac Sinaiticus by Agnes and Margaret Smith. Soskice has also written that she became religious following a very "dramatic but banal" religious experience.

Works

Books

Edited by

References 

1951 births
20th-century English women writers
20th-century Canadian non-fiction writers
20th-century Canadian women writers
20th-century English philosophers
20th-century British Roman Catholic theologians
21st-century British philosophers
21st-century English women writers
21st-century Canadian non-fiction writers
21st-century Canadian women writers
21st-century British Roman Catholic theologians
Alumni of Somerville College, Oxford
Alumni of the University of Sheffield
Canadian feminist writers
Canadian philosophers
Canadian Roman Catholic theologians
Canadian women non-fiction writers
Canadian women philosophers
Catholic feminists
Catholic philosophers
Christian feminist theologians
Converts to Roman Catholicism from Anglicanism
Cornell University alumni
Fellows of Jesus College, Cambridge
Living people
People in Christian ecumenism
Philosophers of religion
Women Christian theologians
Writers about religion and science